King Boxer (lit. "Number One Fist in the World"), also known as Five Fingers of Death, is a 1972 Hong Kong martial arts film directed by Jeong Chang-hwa and starring Lo Lieh. It was produced by Shaw Brothers (HK) Ltd. (Chinese: 邵氏兄弟（香港）公司), the largest Hong Kong movie production studio at the time. The script was written by Chiang Yang (江陽). Made in Hong Kong, it is one of many kung fu movies with Indonesian-born actor Lo Lieh (羅烈) in the lead. He appeared in many similar martial arts film efforts from the 1960s, pre-dating the more internationally successful Bruce Lee.

Released in the United States by Warner Bros. in March 1973 as Five Fingers of Death, the film capitalized on the success of Warner's TV series Kung Fu and was responsible for beginning the North American kung fu film craze of the 1970s with over 30 similar films being released in the U.S. in 1973 alone. Warner followed it with the first U.S.-Chinese Kung Fu co-production Enter the Dragon released later that same year which was the most successful of the chopsocky films of 1973.

Plot
A promising young martial arts student named Chi-Hao has spent most of his life studying under a master and has fallen in love with the master's daughter Yin-Yin. After the master fails to properly fight off a group of thugs, he sends Chi-Hao to study under a superior master, Shen Chin-Pei. He instructs Chi-Hao to learn from Chin-Pei and defeat the local martial arts tyrant, Ming Dung-Shun, in an upcoming tournament in order to earn Yin-Yin's hand.

Chi-Hao meets a young female singer, Yen Chu Hung, on the road to the city and rescues her from Dung-Shun's thugs. She falls in love with him, but he resists her advances with difficulty. He reaches town and begins studying under Suen Chin-Pei. After an initial beating by Chin-Pei's star pupil, Han Lung, Chi-Hao improves rapidly. One day, another thug of Dung-Shun's, Chen Lang, breaks into the school and beats all of Chin-Pei's students. Chin-Pei finally arrives and fights him, but is struck by a dishonorable blow and severely wounded. Chi-Hao tracks Chen Lang down and defeats him. When Chin-Pei hears of this, he selects Chi-Hao to receive his most deadly secret, the Iron Fist.

Han Lung discovers that Chi-Hao has been chosen as Chin-Pei's successor and becomes intensely jealous. He conspires with Dung-Shun to have Chi-Hao crippled. He lures Chi-Hao into the forest, where Dung-Shun's three new Japanese thugs ambush him. They overpower him and break his hands. Later, they visit his old master's school and kill him as well. Yen helps Chi-Hao recuperate and again tries to woo him, but he resists her. Finally, Chi-Hao's fellow students locate him and encourage him to regain his fighting spirit. He begins training and soon overcomes his wounds. Yin-Yin arrives, but withholds the news of her father's death. A rejuvenated Chi-Hao successfully defeats all the other students to become Chin-Pei's representative for the upcoming tournament. Han Lung returns to Dung-Shun with the news, but Dung-Shun's son blinds him and casts him out.

On the day of the tournament, a conscience-stricken Chen Lang warns Chi-Hao of the three Japanese thugs lying in ambush on the road to the arena. Chi-Hao fights the thugs killing two of them. Then Chen Lang arrives and holds off the head of the Japanese thugs so that Chi-Hao can get to the tournament on time. He arrives just in time and defeats Dung-Shun's son to win the tournament. Dung-Shun stabs and kills Chin-Pei in the midst of the celebration and departs. As Dung-Shun arrives back home, he discovers that all the lights are out. Han Lung appears in the darkened room and, guided by Yen's direction, fights Dung-Shun and his son. Han Lung blinds the son, who is then stabbed by his father in the confusion. Dung-Shun bursts out of the dark room and summons his minions who kill Han Lung and he himself kills Yen Chu Hung.

Chi-Hao arrives at Dung Shun's house, but Dung-Shun flees and commits suicide by stabbing himself before Chi-Hao can fight him. As he leaves, the chief Japanese thug arrives with Chen Lang's head. He and Chi-Hao face off. Chi-Hao uses his Iron Fist power, causing his hands to glow red, and delivers several powerful blows that send the thug smashing into a brick wall. With the thug defeated and killed, Chi-Hao, Yin-Yin, and Ta Ming departs.

Cast
Lo Lieh as Chao Chih-Hao
Wang Ping as Sung Ying Ying
Wong Gam-Fung/Wang Chin Feng as Singer Yen Chu-Hung
Tien Feng as Master Meng Tung-Shan
Tung Lam as  Meng Tien-Hsiung
Fang Mian as Master Suen Hsin-Pei
Ku Wen-Chung as Master Sung Wu-Yang

Release
King Boxer was released in Hong Kong on April 28, 1972.(Chang Chang-ho) It was released in March 1973 in the United States as Five Fingers of Death.

Reception

Box office
In the United States and Canada, the film repeated its success in Europe. Five Fingers of Death exceeded  in worldwide rentals by October 1973, and went on to earn  in North American rentals.

Critical reception
In a contemporary review for The New York Times, Roger Greenspun wrote, "I don't know much about karate, but I know what I like. And the karate in 'Five Fingers of Death,' for all its slow-motion high leaps, its grunts, its whooshing fists, has the look of the bottom of the barrel. It is all too extravagant, too gratuitously wild—as if composed for show, rather than for attack, defense or any real purpose." Variety called it "a Chinese actioner glossed with all the explosive trappings that make for a hit in its intended market ... Exquisitely-filmed and packed with colorful production values, direction by Cheng Chang Ho is powerful and direct and he gets top performances from cast headed by Lo Lieh, as the student, and Wang Ping as his beloved." Gene Siskel of the Chicago Tribune gave the film 2 stars out of 4 and called it "a shoddy, poorly dubbed melodrama stuffed with insane dialog," though he acknowledged "the genuine excitement generated by the fight sequences, providing you can get excited at the sight of a karate chop that splits a forehead."  Fredric Milstein wrote in the Los Angeles Times, "Director Chen Chang Ho, who has a definite sense of style, keeps the pace fast and the action spectacular ... Dubbing is awful, but you don't come to this one to hear people talk." In a review for the Monthly Film Bulletin, John Gillett found that the trick effect in which characters leap into the air to land either in a tree or on the opposite side of an opponent become "somewhat tedious as the film progresses." However, "...the sheer panache of the staging and apparent enjoyment of the participants keep the narrative moving swiftly".

In a retrospective review, AllMovie gave the film three stars out of five, stating the film was "not the best Kung fu movie the Shaw Brothers put out, but as an early entry it holds up surprisingly well for a genre getting its legs." The review noted that "a more unfortunate stereotype perpetuated by this and future films is the Japanese as primitive ape-like villains" and that the film "drags a bit on what are now tired Kung fu clichés, but the punchy spirit that made it popular still survives".

Quentin Tarantino listed the movie among his 11 greatest films of all time.

See also
List of Shaw Brothers films
Hong Kong action cinema

References

External links

Essay about Chung Chang-Hwa, and review of the film at "Tracking the Blue Dragon Dumplings"

1972 films
1970s martial arts films
Hong Kong martial arts films
Mandarin-language films
1972 martial arts films
Shaw Brothers Studio films
Warner Bros. films
Kung fu films
Films directed by Jeong Chang-hwa
1970s Hong Kong films